G. Schneider & Sohn is a weissbier brewing company in Bavaria, Germany.

History
The brewery was founded in 1872 by Georg Schneider I and his son Georg Schneider II, after they acquired the Weisses Brauhaus in Munich, the oldest wheat beer brewery in the city. In 1927 the owners, under Georg Schneider IV, expanded their brewing operations into Kelheim and Straubing. After the breweries in Munich were destroyed in 1944 by aerial bombardment by the Allies of World War II, the entire production was relocated to Kelheim. In occupied Germany, a few weeks after the end of World War II, the Third United States Army granted G. Schneider & Sohn permission to continue production of their wheat beers and deliver them to Munich. However, they added the caveats that they could only produce lower alcohol beer and it could only be sold to military personnel. To this day, the owners are descendants of Georg Schneider I.

Today, the brewery employs around 100 people and distributes its products across Germany and 27 other countries. The annual output is about 300,000 hectolitres, of which about 25% is sent outside of Germany.

Owners
The brewery has remained in the Schneider family since its conception in 1872.

Beers
The entire product line consists of top-fermented wheat beers; Aventinus and Original are also bottle conditioned. The wheat comes from the upper Altmühltal, lower Bavaria, and Upper Palatinate regions. The malting barley is grown in the Kelheim and Riedenburg areas. Hallertau hops are used to give the beers their bittering and aromatic properties. The core product is TAP 7 Mein Original (formerly Schneider Weisse Original), which is brewed according to the origin recipe of 1872. Georg Schneider VI renamed the Schneider Weisse product range in 2009, so as to draw attention to the fact that the brewery also produces the products TAP 1 to TAP 6.

Aventinus
Aventinus is a strong, dark, wheat doppelbock introduced in 1907 by Mathilde Schneider and named after Johannes Aventinus, a Bavarian historian. It has an original gravity of 18.5 degrees Plato, and an abv of 8.2% .

Tap 6 Mein Aventinus
In 1907, Matilde Schneider created Aventinus, the first weizenbock of Bavarian history. In 2014, Mein Aventinus won gold in the 'South German-Style Weizenbock' category at the US Brewers Association's World Beer Cup and in 2018 the beer won silver in the same category.

Aventinus Eisbock
Eisbock is a style said to have been 'invented' by accident in the late 19th Century, when during a particularly cold winter, a cistern full of bock beer froze. The water contained in the beer turned into ice; the remaining liquid was in effect of bock concentrate, with more powerful aromas, flavours and alcohol content. This method of freezing beer to increase strength and richness has been duplicated by many breweries, with Schneider first brewing their Aventinus Eisbock in 2002. Schneud In 2017, Aventinus Eisbock won gold in the 'wheat beers' category at the Stockholm Beer and Whiskey Festival.

Range

Inns

The company includes three guesthouses. They are located in the former headquarters in Munich (Tal), in the Munich district of Berg am Laim, and on the brewery site in Kelheim. In early 2016, they were renamed from Weisses Bräuhaus to Schneider Bräuhaus.

Gallery

See also
 Barrel-aged beer

References

External links

Overall opinions at RateBeer

Schneider
Beer brands of Germany
Breweries in Germany
Companies based in Bavaria
Food and drink companies established in 1872
1872 establishments in Bavaria